Fishery Oceanographic Research Vessel Sagar Sampada (FORV Sagar Sampada) is an Indian research vessel that is equipped to carry out multidisciplinary research in oceanography, marine biology and fishery science. This is the unique facility of the country equipped to undertake oceanography and fisheries (demersal) in the same platform.  The vessel is currently managed and operated by the Centre for Marine Living Resources & Ecology (CMLRE), Kochi, a research institute attached to the Ministry of Earth Sciences, Government of India, and is operated from Kochi. FORV Sagar Sampada is a platform for interdisciplinary expeditions in and around the Indian Exclusive Economic Zone, and in International waters with participation from various institutions, from India and abroad.

Built in Denmark, the vessel was commissioned at Mumbai in 1984. As of March 2020, FORV Sagar Sampada has completed 397 oceanographic expeditions, which includes one expedition to the Southern Ocean in the winter of 1995-96 for surveying fishery resources in Antarctic waters (Krill Expedition, FIKEX 1995), one in the southern Ocean with port call at Mauritius and one in the Northern Arabian Sea with port call at Muscat, Oman.

The vessel has an overall length of 72.5m and is ice strengthened. Recently the research facilities are augmented with Continuous Under way Fish Egg Sampler (CUFES), with the technical support of NOAA, USA, 2 Big eye binoculars for the mammal watching  and a Thermosalinograph. The vessel can accommodate 24 research personnel and 35 crew.

References

1984 ships
Research vessels of India
Science and technology in Kochi